The 1981–82 season was FC Dinamo București's 33rd season in Divizia A. Dinamo dominated both national competitions, winning the tenth championship title and the fourth Romanian Cup. The UEFA Cup season brings some great wins for Dinamo. The red-whites meet Levski Sofia, team of Sirakov and Iskrenov (3-0 and 1-2). In the second round, a terrifying "double": Dinamo-Internazionale (with Bergoni, Bagni, Prohaska, Altobelli, Baresi, Oriali, Marini and Becallossi). At Milan, 1-1 (authors: Pasinato and Custov) and back home in Bucharest, 3-2 for the "dogs", in the extra time! Dinamo is eliminated by the Swedish team IFK Göteborg, managed by Sven-Göran Eriksson, which later ends up winning the trophy.

Results

Romanian Cup final

UEFA Cup 

First round

Dinamo București won 4-2 on aggregate

Second round

Dinamo București won 4–3 on aggregate

Third round

IFK Göteborg won 4-1 on aggregate

Squad 

Goalkeepers: Constantin Eftimescu (6 / 0); Dumitru Moraru (31 / 0).
Defenders: Marin Ion (30 / 0); Nicușor Vlad (9 / 1); Adrian Bumbescu (23 / 0); Cornel Dinu (29 / 0); Gheorghe Dumitrescu (3 / 0); Teofil Stredie (25 / 2); Nelu Stănescu (28 / 0); Ioan Mărginean (6 / 1).
Midfielders:  Ionel Augustin (31 / 7); Marin Dragnea (23 / 7); Gheorghe Mulțescu (26 / 9); Alexandru Custov (31 / 6); Laurențiu Moldovan  (6 / 0).
Forwards: Cornel Țălnar (30 / 2); Pompiliu Iordache (15 / 1); Dudu Georgescu (24 / 11); Florea Văetuș (13 / 5); Costel Orac (32 / 9); Dorel Zamfir (9 / 0).
(league appearances and goals listed in brackets)

Manager: Valentin Stănescu.

References 

 www.labtof.ro
 www.romaniansoccer.ro

1981
Association football clubs 1981–82 season
Romanian football clubs 1981–82 season
1981